This article presents a list of the historical events and publications of Australian literature during 1985.

Events
 Christopher Koch won the 1985 Miles Franklin Award for The Doubleman

Major publications

Novels 
 Thea Astley, Beachmasters
 Peter Carey, Illywhacker
 Kate Grenville, Lilian's Story
 Christopher Koch, The Doubleman

Children's and young adult fiction 
 Pamela Allen, A Lion in the Night
 Duncan Ball, Selby's Secret
 Robin Klein, Halfway Across the Galaxy and Turn Left
 Gillian Rubinstein, Space Demons

Poetry 
 Robert Gray, Selected Poems 1963–1983
 Chris Wallace-Crabbe, The Amorous Cannibal

Drama 
 Jack Davis, No Sugar
 Michael Gow, The Astronaut’s Wife
 Louis Nowra, The Golden Age (Nowra play)
 David Williamson, Sons of Cain

Science fiction and fantasy
 Victor Kelleher, The Beast Of Heaven

Awards and honours
Jack Davis , for "service to Aboriginal literature and theatre"
Frank Moorhouse , for "service to Australian literature"
Morris West , for "service to literature"

Births 
A list, ordered by date of birth (and, if the date is either unspecified or repeated, ordered alphabetically by surname) of births in 1985 of Australian literary figures, authors of written works or literature-related individuals follows, including year of death.

Unknown date
 Hannah Kent, historical novelist

Deaths 
A list, ordered by date of death (and, if the date is either unspecified or repeated, ordered alphabetically by surname) of deaths in 1985 of Australian literary figures, authors of written works or literature-related individuals follows, including year of birth.

 26 January — Anne Spencer Parry, pioneer fantasy writer (born 1931)
 14 February — Douglas Stewart, poet, short story writer, essayist and literary editor (born 1913)
 19 April — John Manifold, poet and critic (born 1915)
 5 May — Carter Brown, writer of detective fiction (born 1923)
 18 July — F. B. Vickers, novelist (born 1903)
 29 July — Judah Waten, novelist (born 1911)
 11 September — Eleanor Dark, novelist (born 1901)
 4 November — A. A. Phillips, writer, critic and teacher, best known for coining the term "Cultural Cringe" (born 1900)

See also 
 1985 in Australia
 1985 in literature
 1985 in poetry
 List of years in literature
 List of years in Australian literature

References

1985 in Australia
Australian literature by year
20th-century Australian literature
1985 in literature